Clarence E. Hobgood (August 30, 1914 – February 29, 2008) was the suffragan bishop for the Armed Forces in the Episcopal Church in the United States of America from 1971 to 1978.

Hobgood was consecrated on February 2, 1971.

External links 
Four Priests Nominated For Armed Forces Bishop
Charles Hobgood, second Armed Forces bishop, dies in North Carolina

1914 births
2008 deaths
United States Air Force officers
United States Air Force chaplains
20th-century American Episcopalians
Episcopal bishops for the Armed Forces (United States)
20th-century American clergy